Vasyl Arkadiyovych Yevseyev (30 August 1962 – 26 June 2010) was a Ukrainian professional football coach and player.

Career
Yevseyev made his professional debut in the Soviet First League in 1980 for FC Zarya Voroshilovgrad.

Coaching career
He worked as an assistant manager with FC Arsenal Kyiv.

Personal life
He was father of Ukrainian footballer Yevhen Yevseyev, who played for FC Arsenal Kyiv and was killed in a car accident on 19 August 2011.

Death
On 26 June 2010, Yevseyev committed suicide by jumping.

Honours
 Soviet Top League champion: 1985, 1986.
 Soviet Cup winner: 1987.

European club competitions
With FC Dynamo Kyiv.

 European Cup 1986–87: 3 games.
 European Cup 1987–88: 2 games.

References

1962 births
2010 suicides
Footballers from Luhansk
Soviet footballers
Ukrainian footballers
Ukrainian expatriate footballers
Soviet Top League players
Russian Premier League players
FC Bukovyna Chernivtsi players
FC Zorya Luhansk players
FC Dynamo Kyiv players
FC Shakhtar Donetsk players
MFC Mykolaiv players
FC Tekstilshchik Kamyshin players
Maccabi Haifa F.C. players
FC Elista players
Expatriate footballers in Israel
Ukrainian football managers
FC CSKA Kyiv managers
FC Arsenal Kyiv managers
FC Nyva Vinnytsia players
Suicides by jumping in Ukraine
Association football defenders